Tjeldsund Church is a parish church of the Church of Norway in Tjeldsund Municipality in Troms og Finnmark county, Norway. It is located in the village of Hol i Tjeldsund on the island of Tjeldøya. It is the main church for the Tjeldsund parish which is part of the Trondenes prosti (deanery) in the Diocese of Nord-Hålogaland. The white, wooden church was built in a long church style in 1901 using plans drawn up by the architect Ole Scheistrøen. The church seats about 420 people.

History
The earliest existing historical records of the church date back to 1589, but the church was not new at that time. Not much is recorded about the early medieval churches, but in 1703 a new church building was constructed (or a previous building was heavily renovated). In 1768, a new church was built on the site. This church was a long church design with a sacristy. The entry porch on the new church was constructed from salvaged materials from the old church. After the new church was completed, the old church was torn down and its materials were purchased by a local man who used them to build a barn. In 1899-1901, the church was dismantled and heavily remodeled after expanding the foundation walls. After the renovation, it has a rectangular nave and narrower, rectangular choir with a narrower, aspe on the end of the choir. On each side of the choir there are sacristies. To the west is an entry porch with a tower above it. There are also two small extensions on each side of the nave which give the building a cross-shape.

Media gallery

See also
List of churches in Nord-Hålogaland

References

Tjeldsund
Churches in Troms
Wooden churches in Norway
20th-century Church of Norway church buildings
Churches completed in 1901
16th-century establishments in Norway
Long churches in Norway